Morse is an unincorporated community in Stark County, Illinois, United States, located             north-northwest of Bradford. 1800 road north goes north of Morse.

References

Unincorporated communities in Stark County, Illinois
Unincorporated communities in Illinois
Peoria metropolitan area, Illinois